Geising is a Stadtteil (municipal division) of Altenberg in the Sächsische Schweiz-Osterzgebirge district, in Saxony, Germany. Since 1 January 2011, it is part of the town Altenberg.

References

Towns in the Ore Mountains
Altenberg, Saxony